Lieutenant General Raymond Francois Holtzhausen SSA SD SM MMM (born 1934) is a South African Army general who served as Chief of Staff Personnel before his retirement.

He served as Officer Commanding of South African Infantry School from 1972 to 1974.

He later served as Chief of Army Staff Personnel and Inspector General of the Army

References

South African Army generals
1934 births
Living people